Joseph Agbeko (born 22 March 1980) is a Ghanaian professional boxer. He is a two-time former bantamweight world champion, having held the IBF title twice between 2007 and 2011. Additionally he held the Commonwealth bantamweight title from 2004 to 2006; the IBO bantamweight title in 2013; and has challenged once for a super bantamweight world title in 2013.

Professional career 

On September 29, 2007, he dethroned Luis Alberto Perez to become the new IBF bantamweight titleholder. Agbeko was inactive for 1 year, 2 months and 11 days before defending his title on December 11, 2008. In a fight that had been repeatedly postponed, he defeated William Gonzalez by majority decision. On July 11, 2009, Agbeko successfully defended his IBF bantamweight title by scoring a unanimous decision win over former two division champion Vic Darchinyan. On Halloween night, October 31, 2009, Agbeko lost his IBF title by 12 round unanimous decision to 20-0 Colombian challenger Yonnhy Pérez.

Perez vs. Agbeko II 

On December 11, 2010, Agbeko was given the chance to regain his IBF title when he took on Yonnhy Pérez in the semi-finals of the Showtime Bantamweight tournament, which was televised live from The Battle at the Boat series at the Emerald Queen Casino in Tacoma, Washington. Rather than brawling as he had done in his first fight with Pérez, Agbeko chose to use his boxing skills and stiff jab to cruise to a unanimous decision victory, with the judges scoring it 116–112, 117-111 and 115–113. Also on the card was Abner Mares, who defeated Vic Darchinyan via controversial split-decision to advance to the finals and a showdown with Agbeko.

Agbeko vs. Mares 

"King Kong" Agbeko was scheduled to take on Abner Mares in the Bantamweight Tournament Final: Winner Takes All on Saturday, April 23 on Showtime. However, Agbeko pulled out of the fight just days prior citing an injury. The fight has been rescheduled for August 13 in Las Vegas.

The fight ensued as scheduled on the 13th. However, the focal point of the fight became referee Russell Mora who repeatedly warned Mares for low blows without taking a point. To Agbeko's credit, despite at least 23 blows to the belt and below, he did not retaliate in kind.

Post fight Jim Gray continued Showtime's lambasting of Mora in an interview where he plainly showed the crucial call that turned the fight. A low blow in the 11th leading to a knockdown.

In all there were two knockdowns. The first coming early could have been called a slip but a punch was landed. The second was the result of what was definitely a low blow. It is possible that without the knockdown, Mares would not have won the fight. The scoring read 115–111, 115-111 and 113-113.

Professional boxing record

Honors 
In 2010, to honor Joseph's exploits in the sport of boxing, the town of Sogakope in the Volta Region of Ghana enstooled him as a warrior chief. His enstoolment name was Togbe Kaletor I, which means 'Brave Warrior.'

References

External links 

1980 births
Bantamweight boxers
International Boxing Federation champions
Living people
World bantamweight boxing champions
Ghanaian male boxers
Super-bantamweight boxers
Boxers from Accra
African Boxing Union champions
International Boxing Organization champions
Commonwealth Boxing Council champions